EP3 is the third EP in a series of EPs released by American alternative rock band Pixies, released on March 24, 2014.

Track listing
"Bagboy" – 4:53
"Silver Snail" – 3:29
"Ring the Bell" – 3:35
"Jaime Bravo" – 4:24

Personnel
Pixies
Black Francis – vocals, guitar
David Lovering – drums
Joey Santiago – guitar

Additional personnel
Ding (Simon "Dingo" Archer) – bass guitar
Vaughan Oliver – artwork

References

External links
 Official music videos:
 Bagboy (1)
 Bagboy (2)
 Silver Snail
 Ring the Bell

Pixies (band) EPs
2014 EPs
Self-released EPs
Albums recorded at Rockfield Studios